Gerard Adams Sr. (1926 – 17 November 2003) was a Belfast Irish Republican Army (IRA) volunteer who took part in its Northern Campaign in the 1940s. He has also been described as "important in the emergence of the Provisional IRA in 1970".

Adams was captured after being shot and wounded during an IRA operation in 1942 after he shot an RUC police officer in the foot. He was sentenced to eight years in prison and served five. He was interned in 1971 along with his son, Gerry Adams.

He married Anne Hannaway, also a Republican from an established republican family, by whom he had thirteen children (three of whom died in infancy). His children include Gerry Adams, who became a leading figure in Sinn Féin and was its president until 2018, as well as a former abstentionist MP for West Belfast  and former TD, as well as Liam Adams, who died serving a prison sentence in Northern Ireland for raping his daughter.

He died on 17 November 2003, "a lonely old man". He was buried with the Irish tricolour, despite the private reservations of family members over alleged abuse that would only be made public some years later. His son Gerry Adams said that he felt his father had 'besmirched' the flag.

In December 2009, six years after his death, his family claimed that he had subjected some members of his family to emotional, physical and sexual abuse over many years. The family said that this abuse "had a devastating impact" on the family, with which they were still then coming to terms. The family decided to go public about the abuse in order to help other families in similar circumstances.

See also
Public Prosecution Service of Northern Ireland v. Liam Adams

References

External links
Obituary from The Guardian

1926 births
2003 deaths
Irish Republican Army (1922–1969) members
Irish republicans interned without trial
Paramilitaries from Belfast
Shooting survivors
Child sexual abuse in Northern Ireland